Main Ridge is a rural locality on the Mornington Peninsula in Melbourne, Victoria, Australia, approximately  south of Melbourne's Central Business District, located within the Shire of Mornington Peninsula local government area. Main Ridge recorded a population of 453 at the 2021 census.

South of and inland from Rosebud and originally known as Main Creek, the district consists of the western spine of Arthurs Seat and the southern hinterlands. A R & F Ditterich Reserve, containing a hall, picnic and sports facilities, and the nearby CFA are the main facilities in the district, while several wineries such as Poplar Bend and Ryland River are located here.

The southern part of the locality, alongside Main Creek, is part of the Mornington Peninsula National Park called Greens Bush, a native bushland area first set aside for conservation in 1974 and supporting the largest population of eastern grey kangaroos on the Mornington Peninsula. Several walking tracks provide access to the area.

See also
 Shire of Flinders – Main Ridge was previously within this former local government area.

References

Towns in Victoria (Australia)
Mornington Peninsula
Western Port